is a federal motorway running through north Hesse. It connects Kassel with the Schwalm-Eder-Kreis, where it ends in Neuental. The motorway is planned to be extended to Gemünden (Felda) with a connection to A 5.

Course 
A 49 splits off from A 7 at Kreuz Kassel-Mitte and continues as a city motorway through Kassel to Baunatal over the river Fulda. It then continues through the communities of Edermünde, Gudensberg, Fritzlar, Wabern, Borken and Neuental in the Schwalm-Eder region. Along this stretch, there are motorway viaducts over the Ems, Eder and Schwalm rivers, the latter being bridged over twice.

At its current end in Neuental, the A 49 flows into state road 3074. As this road is not designed to handle motorway traffic, the 8.5 kilometer-long stretch between Borken and Neuental is prohibited for heavy traffic.

Exit list 

 

 

 (Hessen) 

 

 
 (Hessen)

 (Ohm)

|}

Planned extension 
For decades, there have been wranglings over a 42.5 km extension of the A 49 from Neuental southwards to ease traffic on the A 7 and better serve the cities of Kassel and Marburg towards the Rhein-Main Region. The probable route from Neuental would be:

 Schwalmstadt
 Neustadt (Hessen)
 Stadtallendorf
 A 5 near Gemünden (Felda)

The last section to be opened to traffic was between the exits at Borken and Neuental in December 1994. There has been no further extension of the A 49 since then.

The planning approval procedure for the section between Stadtallendorf and A 5 should have been completed by 2004. The A 49 was originally intended to run through the Herrenwald forest to the east of Stadtallendorf. However, after conservationists discovered a population of Great Crested Newts there, the stretch through the forest became problematic, and plans were changed so that the motorway would now run even further east around the forest.

The planning approval procedure for the section from the current motorway end near Bischhausen to Schwalmstadt was approved in September 2007 by the planning approval committee, but financing from the government has yet to be finalised. This section would cost 183 million euro. The German branch of Friends of the Earth filed a suit against the planned extension in January 2008 before the Federal Administrative Court in Leipzig. However, the A 49 extension was declared immediately executable by federal law, so the complaint could not halt the possible construction work. In April 2009, BUND withdrew its complaint.

The planning approval procedure for the two further sections of Schwalmstadt-Stadtallendorf and Stadtallenddorf-A 5 are still being discussed, but a decision is expected shortly.

The A 49 was originally supposed to follow a different course: from Kassel past Fritzlar, Schwalmstadt, Stadtallendorf, Kirchhain and Marburg to Gießen. Near Marburg, the A 49 would flow into the current state road 3, which has been upgraded to a freeway. From Gießen, the A 49 would have continued past Butzbach, Bad Nauheim and Friedberg to Frankfurt am Main, crossing Federal motorway 5 just past Butzbach. From Preungesheimer Dreieck, the A 49 would have followed the route of the current A 661 past Offenbach am Main and Egelsbach to Darmstadt, where it was supposed to end at A 5 south of the city.

The plan now is for the A 49 to continue from its current end past Schwalmstadt and Stadtallendorf to Federal motorway 5 as quickly as possible, and thereby foregoing the previous plan to connect Kassel and Marburg with a motorway. Several sections of the original A 49 have been constructed with different names: the four-lane section of Federal road 3 between Marburg and the Gießen North interchange, between Karben and the Preungesheimer Dreieck, Bundesautobahn 485 between the Gießener Nordkreuz and Butzbach, and Bundesautobahn 661 between the Preungesheimer Dreieck and Egelsbach.

Constructions built for the A 49 extension, such as the Egelsbach junction and a service station near Dreieich, have been dismantled. The proposed easterly by-pass of Darmstadt has been abandoned due to nature conservation issues.

Notes

External links 

 
 Planungsstand der A 49 des Amtes für Straßen- und Verkehrswesen in Kassel
 https://web.archive.org/web/20070928151201/http://www.gps-kassel.de/touren/kartegross/a49.kmz der geplanten Streckenführung Neuental-Schwalmstadt
 Gemeinschaft gegen den Weiterbau der A49 von Neuental nach Gemünden

49
A049
North Hesse